Paul Harford Wilkins (born 20 March 1964) is an English former professional footballer who played in the Football League for Crystal Palace and Preston North End as a forward.

Career
Wilkins was born in Hackney and began his career at Tottenham Hotspur as an apprentice but did not go on to make a league appearance. In January 1982, he signed for Crystal Palace, then playing in the Second Division. He made his debut, as a substitute for David Giles, in a 1–2 home defeat to Barnsley on 1 May. He went on to make a total of five appearances that season (three as substitute) and scored twice on his first starting appearance in a 2–1 home win against Wrexham. In 1982–83, Wilkins made only one appearance, as a substitute and a further seven appearances in 1983–84 (one goal). In June 1984, Wilkins moved on to Preston North End for whom he made six league appearances scoring twice, before moving into non-league football with Fisher Athletic in 1985. He subsequently played for Chelmsford City from 1986 to 1988.

References

External links
Wilkins at holmesdale.net

1964 births
Living people
English footballers
Association football forwards
Footballers from the London Borough of Hackney
Tottenham Hotspur F.C. players
Crystal Palace F.C. players
Preston North End F.C. players
Fisher Athletic F.C. players
Chelmsford City F.C. players
English Football League players